Orthophytum alvimii is a plant species in the genus Orthophytum.

The bromeliad is endemic to the Atlantic Forest biome (Mata Atlantica Brasileira), located in southeastern Brazil.

References

alvimii
Endemic flora of Brazil
Flora of the Atlantic Forest
Flora of Bahia